= Sado (restaurant) =

Restaurant in St. Louis, Missouri, U.S.

- Interactive map of Sado

Restaurant information
- Location: 5201 Shaw Avenue, St. Louis, Missouri, 63110, United States
- Coordinates: 38°37′05″N 90°16′21″W

Sado is a restaurant in St. Louis, Missouri. It was a semifinalist in the Best New Restaurant category of the James Beard Foundation Awards in 2024.
